Uniko is a studio album by the Kronos Quartet, Kimmo Pohjonen and Samuli Kosminen.The entire work was composed by Finnish artists / composers Kimmo Pohjonen and Samuli Kosminen Uniko, which was commissioned by the quartet in 2003, premiered in 2004 and was also performed in 2007 in New York City at the BAM NEXT WAVE festival and in 2012 at Colours of Ostrava.

Track listing

Credits

Musicians
David Harrington – violin
John Sherba – violin
Hank Dutt – viola
Jeffrey Zeigler – cello
Kimmo Pohjonen – accordion, voice
Samuli Kosminen – electronic percussion, samples, programming

Production
Recorded at Avatar Studios, New York City, 2007
Valgeir Sigurðsson – producer
Pauli Sastamoinen – mastering
Phillip Page – executive producer
Rixi Ostariz – graphics and design
Chikako Harada – photography

See also
List of 2011 albums

References 

2011 albums
Albums produced by Valgeir Sigurðsson
Kronos Quartet albums